Nordmannsfonna is a glacier in Sabine Land at Spitsbergen, Svalbard. The glacier covers an area of about 250 km2, is located between Sassendalen and Storfjorden, and extends from Jebensfjellet to the north to Roslagenfjellet and Eistraryggen to the south. The glacier consists of a number of sub-glaciers or side glaciers, and drains both westwards to Sassendalen and eastwards to Storfjorden.

References

Glaciers of Spitsbergen